The 1979 Eastern 8 men's basketball tournament was held in Pittsburgh, Pennsylvania, at the Civic Arena from February 27 to March 3, 1979 (First Round games were held at campus sites). Rutgers defeated Pittsburgh 61-57 in the final.

Bracket

Final standings

References

Atlantic 10 men's basketball tournament
Tournament
Eastern 8 men's basketball tournament
Eastern 8 men's basketball tournament
Eastern 8 men's basketball tournament